Y.N.P may refer to:

Yosemite National Park in the U.S.
Yellowstone National Park in the U.S.
Yoho National Park in Canada
Yangmingshan National Park in Taiwan